Cungulla is a coastal town and a locality in the City of Townsville, Queensland, Australia.

History 
Cungulla is recorded as an Aboriginal word from the Burdekin River area, possibly meaning holiday. It was approved as the town name by Surveyor-General of Queensland on 6 September 1956.

Education 
There are no schools in Cungulla. The nearest government primary school is Giru State School in Giru to the south. The nearest government secondary school is William Ross State High School in Annandale, Townsville, to the north-west.

References

External links 
 

Towns in Queensland
City of Townsville
Coastline of Queensland
Localities in Queensland